Back for the First Time is the major label debut studio album by American hip hop recording artist Ludacris. The album, his major label debut, was released on October 17, 2000 as planned, under Disturbing tha Peace and Def Jam South.

Background
Most of the tracks are taken from his first album, the independently released Incognegro (1999), except for "Stick 'Em Up", "Southern Hospitality", a remix of "What's Your Fantasy", and "Phat Rabbit".

Commercial performance
The album debuted at number four on the US Billboard 200 chart, and sold 133,000 copies in its first-week of sales. As of November 2009, the album has sold 3.1 million copies in the United States to date. The album was eventually certified triple Platinum by the Recording Industry Association of America (RIAA) for shipments of more than 3 million copies.

Track listing

Sample credits

Phat Rabbit
"Are You That Somebody?" by Aaliyah
1st & 10 
"How High" by Method Man and Redman
"Where Did We Go Wrong" by Incognito
What's Your Fantasy
"Face Down, A** Up" by Luke

Charts

Weekly charts

Year-end charts

Certifications

References

2000 albums
Albums produced by Bangladesh (record producer)
Albums produced by the Neptunes
Albums produced by Organized Noize
Albums produced by Jermaine Dupri
Albums produced by Timbaland
Def Jam Recordings albums
Ludacris albums
Disturbing tha Peace albums